Michael Fitzsimons (born 9 April 1989) is an Irish Gaelic footballer who plays for Cuala in Dalkey as well as for the Dublin county team. Cuala is a traditional hurling stronghold in Dublin and he was only the second player from Cuala to play inter-county football along with Mick Holden.

Dublin Senior
He plays fullback for Dublin and made his senior championship debut in 2010 against Wexford. He won an All-Ireland Junior Football Championship and Leinster Junior Football Championship medal with Dublin in 2008. Michael won the Leinster Senior Football Championship with Dublin in July 2011 at Croke Park against Wexford. He won the All-Ireland Senior Football Championship with Dublin in September 2011 against Kerry at Croke Park. He won his second and third All Ireland titles in 2013 and 2015 with Dublin respectively. Michael won his fourth all-Ireland medal with Dublin in a replay against Mayo at Croke. He was awarded man of the match for his contribution during the game.

Personal
He was educated at Johnstown Boys Primary, Killiney, C.B.C. Monkstown and holds a degree in physiotherapy from University College Dublin. After working as a physiotherapist for several years, he is now studying medicine at UCD.

References

1989 births
Living people
Alumni of University College Dublin
Cuala Gaelic footballers
Dublin inter-county Gaelic footballers
Gaelic football backs
Irish physiotherapists
Winners of eight All-Ireland medals (Gaelic football)
Sportspeople from Dún Laoghaire–Rathdown
People educated at C.B.C. Monkstown